The 1998 CAA men's basketball tournament was held February 26 to March 1, 1998, at the Richmond Coliseum in Richmond, Virginia. The winner of the tournament was Richmond, who received an automatic bid to the 1998 NCAA Men's Division I Basketball Tournament.

Bracket

Honors

References

Tournament
Colonial Athletic Association men's basketball tournament
CAA men's basketball tournament
CAA men's basketball tournament
CAA men's basketball tournament
Sports competitions in Virginia
Basketball in Virginia